The Itkillik River is a  tributary of the Colville River in the North Slope Borough of the U.S. state of Alaska. An Iñupiaq map, drawn in about 1900, identifies the river as It-kil-lik, meaning Indian.

A melting permafrost formation exposed along the Itkillik River is the largest known yedoma in Alaska. The ice is rich in methane. Odors emitted by the gasses released when the ice thaws have led to the site's nickname, the Stinking Hills or Stinky Bluffs.

See also
List of rivers of Alaska

References

Rivers of North Slope Borough, Alaska
Rivers of Alaska